is a passenger railway station located in Tarumi-ku, Kobe, Hyōgo Prefecture, Japan, operated by the private Sanyo Electric Railway.

Lines

Station layout
The station consists of two opposed side platforms connected by an elevated station building. The station is unattended.

Platforms

Adjacent stations

|-
!colspan=5|Sanyo Electric Railway

History
Higashi-Tarumi Station opened on April 12, 1917.

Passenger statistics
In fiscal 2018, the station was used by an average of 767 passengers daily (boarding passengers only).

Surrounding area
 Higashi Tarumi Observatory Park
 Hiraiso Kaizuri Park
 Tarumi Sports Garden Multipurpose Ground

See also
List of railway stations in Japan

References

External links

 Official website (Sanyo Electric Railway) 

Railway stations in Japan opened in 1917
Railway stations in Kobe